Golden Bauhinia Awards is a Hong Kong film award organised by the Hong Kong Film Critics Association. Its first award presentation ceremony took place in 1996.

The award attracted controversy in 2007, when ten nominations were given to Pang Ho-Cheung’s Exodus before it had been screened anywhere publicly and the Best Film Award was shared by three movies. Its credibility under intense scrutiny, the association decided to suspend the award until further notice.

Awards ceremonies

Notes

External links
 Golden Bauhinia Awards website

Chinese film awards
Cinema of Hong Kong
Awards established in 1996
Annual events in Hong Kong
Recurring events established in 1996
1996 establishments in Hong Kong